"One with the Freaks" is a promotional single from the 2002 album Neon Golden by German indietronica band The Notwist. The song is listed as the 318th best song of the 2000s by Pitchfork Media.

Track listing
"One With the Freaks" - 3:41

References

2002 songs
2002 singles
Electronica songs